Tangeni Amupadhi is a Namibian journalist. He is the Editor-in-chief of The Namibian, Namibia's largest English daily newspaper. In 2011 he took over from founding and long-serving editor Gwen Lister, who has been in the position for 26 years.

Amupadhi worked at the Namibia Press Agency, South Africa's Mail & Guardian  newspaper, and The Namibian. He is a Fulbright scholar at the University of Maryland, College Park as well as a Nieman Fellow at Harvard University, both in the U.S. In 2004, together with several people, he set up Insight Namibia as a private media company bringing out a monthly business and current affairs magazine. He worked as the magazine's editor until 2011.

References

External links 
The Namibian

People from Windhoek
Ovambo people
Namibian newspaper editors
Namibian newspaper journalists
Nieman Fellows
Living people
African newspaper editors
Year of birth missing (living people)